Ilias Rosidis (3 February 1927 – 27 December 2019) was a Greek footballer who played for Olympiacos FC and the Greece national team throughout his career.

Club career
A talented right back, Rosidis is considered a legend amongst the Olympiacos faithful. During a career that spanned almost 20 years at the Piraeus club, Rosidis captained the club during their golden era of the 1950s. From 1954 to 1959, Rosidis led the club to a then unheard of six consecutive Greek Championships. In that same period, Rosidis lifted the Greek Cup on 3 occasions, making Olympiacos the only Greek club to have won 3 consecutive doubles. In total, Rosidis finished his Olympiacos' career with 7 Greek Championships, 9 Cups, 5 doubles, and over 500 appearances for his club.

International career
During the 1950s, Rosidis was a key member in the Greece national football team. He earned 29 caps during this time period. Rossidis played for Greece at the 1952 Summer Olympics.
In 2012 Rosidis carried the London 2012 Olympic torch and lit the cauldron in Piraeus the day before it was handed over to London.

Honours

Olympiacos
Panhellenic Championship: 1950–51, 1953–54, 1954–55, 1955–56, 1956–57, 1957–58, 1958–59
Greek Cup: 1950–51, 1951–52, 1952–53, 1953–54, 1956–57, 1957–58, 1958–59, 1959–60, 1960–61

References

1927 births
2019 deaths
Greece international footballers
Greek footballers
Olympiacos F.C. players
Olympic footballers of Greece
Footballers at the 1952 Summer Olympics
Association football defenders
Mediterranean Games gold medalists for Greece
Mediterranean Games medalists in football
Footballers at the 1951 Mediterranean Games
Footballers from Piraeus